West Deerfield Township is located in Lake County, Illinois. The population was 31,077 at the 2010 census. West Deerfield Township was formed from former Deerfield Township (now Moraine Township) in 1888.

Economy 
Walgreens has its corporate headquarters in Deerfield within West Deerfield Township. In 1987 Walgreens employed about 1,100 people at its headquarters, which was at the time in an unincorporated area on the west side of Deerfield. As of 2000 the Walgreens headquarters was still in an unincorporated area in West Deerfield Township.

References

External links 

 
US Census
Illinois State Archives

Townships in Lake County, Illinois
Townships in Illinois